Kilcunda was a railway station on the Wonthaggi line along the Bass Coast in Victoria, Australia. 

It was an electric staff station from its opening until December 1916. The original station site, on a stretch of level track backing on to the ocean, was abandoned in 1925 due to coastal erosion, although a goods siding remained there until 1954. The station operated at that site until the line's closure in 1978. There is almost no trace left of the station, and the site is now part of the Bass Coast Rail Trail.

Disused railway stations in Victoria (Australia)
Transport in Gippsland (region)
Bass Coast Shire